Vadim Vladimirovich Klass (born 4 July 1979) is a former Russian professional footballer.

Club career
He played 3 seasons in the Russian Football National League for FC Lokomotiv St. Petersburg.

References

External links
 

1979 births
Living people
Russian footballers
Association football forwards
FC Lokomotiv Nizhny Novgorod players
FC Lokomotiv Saint Petersburg players
FC Sever Murmansk players
Russian expatriate footballers
Expatriate footballers in Finland
FC Zenit-2 Saint Petersburg players